The following is a list of Christian country artists.

Christian country music, sometimes marketed as country gospel, inspirational country is country music that is written to express either personal or a communal belief regarding Christian life, as well as (in terms of the varying music styles) to give a Christian alternative to mainstream secular music. It originated as a blend of early mountain music, cowboy music, and the music from the plantations of the Deep South. The Encyclopedia of Contemporary Christian Music (2002) defines CCM as "music that appeals to self-identified fans of contemporary Christian music on account of a perceived connection to what they regard as Christianity". Based on this definition, this list includes artists that work in the Christian music industry as well as artists in the general market.

List 

16 Horsepower
David Eugene Edwards
Dennis Agajanian
Lauren Alaina
The Alpha Band
Susan Ashton
Chris August
Josh Baldwin
Big Tent Revival
Glen Campbell
Bruce Carroll
Johnny Cash
Gary Chapman
Steven Curtis Chapman
David L. Cook
Daniel Amos
Charlie Daniels
Danny Gokey
Buddy Greene
Kim Hill
Mallary Hope
James Kilbane
Kris Kristofferson
Cristy Lane
Scotty McCreery
Richie McDonald
Susie McEntire
Reba McEntire
Tim McGraw
Mercy River Boys
Julie Miller
Paul Overstreet
Dolly Parton
Charley Pride
Steve Richard
Kenny Rogers
Hillary Scott
Ricky Skaggs
Randy Travis
Josh Turner
Carrie Underwood
The Way
The Whites
Hank Williams Sr.
Anne Wilson
Whosoever South
Wovenhand
Cody McCarver

Brad Paisley

See also
List of Christian bands and artists by genre

References

Bibliography
 

Country